Sônia Maria Vieira Gonçalves, better known by her stage name Susana Vieira and Suzana Vieira (born August 23, 1942) is a Brazilian actress.

Biography and career 
Susana's father, Marius Gonçalves, was a military man and was a military attaché at the Brazilian embassy in Buenos Aires. Her mother, Maria da Conceição Vieira Gonçalves, worked at the Buenos Aires consulate, which was followed by the marriage and the birth of their children. Susana, baptized as Sônia Maria Vieira Gonçalves, was born in São Paulo Maternity, in the city of São Paulo. The artistic name of Susana is in fact her sister's Christian name, the Argentine actress Susana Gonçalves. In addition to Susana Gonçalves, Susana Vieira has three other brothers: Sérgio Ricardo Vieira Gonçalves, Sérvulo Augusto Vieira Gonçalves and Sandra Vieira Gonçalves. Susana's grandparents were Portuguese.

She graduated in classical ballet, she joined the corps de ballet Grande Teatro Tupi in 1961. Eventually, she debuted as actress in A Noite Eterna, a 1962 telenovela. Since then, Susana has worked in several Rede Globo telenovelas.

She debuted as a singer with the album Brasil Encena, published by Albatroz Music on December 19, 2010. However, she stated that she doesn't intend to start a career as singer.

Filmography

Television

Film

Personal life
Susana was married, from 1961 to 1972, to director Régis Cardoso, with whom she had a son called Rodrigo. She married Carson Gardeazabal in 1986, a relationship which ended in 2003. In September 2006, she married Marcelo Silva. However, she divorced him in November 2008 after discovering he had a mistress. In 2009, she got engaged to the magician Sandro Pedroso but they broke up in early 2014.
By her own words, in Brazil there's no one as powerful as her and God.

Awards and nominations

Notes

References

External links

1942 births
Living people
Actresses from São Paulo
Brazilian people of Portuguese descent
Brazilian film actresses
Brazilian telenovela actresses
Brazilian television actresses
Brazilian Roman Catholics